Pahladgarh is a village in the Bhiwani district of the Indian state of Haryana. , the village had 2168 households with a total population of 5,286 of which 3,209 were male and 2,506 female.

References

Villages in Bhiwani district